Barrington Renford Patterson (25 August 1965 – 22 March 2022) was an English kickboxer and mixed martial artist. At , he competed in the super heavyweight division and once fought for a world International Kickboxing Federation Kickboxing Championship.

Biography
As a child Patterson was blinded in one eye through an accident, when his sister threw a can at him. This later earned him the name "One Eye Baz". In the early years of his life while growing up in the tough streets of Handsworth, Birmingham, Patterson adopted a criminal lifestyle with an addiction to violence; this was during the early 1980s, when relationships between ethnic communities in the inner cities and the police force were tense. The decision of Patterson and other members of the black community to make a stand resulted in the 1980s Handsworth riots.

In 2006, Patterson was featured in the television documentary The Real Football Factories, broadcast on Bravo. In 2008 a full episode of Danny Dyer's Deadliest men series was based on Patterson's life around Coventry, hosted by British actor Danny Dyer, in which he described Patterson as one of the most intimidating individuals he had ever met. The filming was built up towards his retirement MMA bout against Bob Schrijber and later broadcast on Bravo, Sky and Virgin Media channels.

After retiring, Patterson continued training himself and coaching others, including German MMA fighter Nordin Asrih and members of the Team Pride Gym of Germany, as well as former England Test cricketer, Ian Bell. Patterson was based in the West Midlands, where he also headed the toughest doors of Coventry's clubland and had a security business with staff working for him in Coventry and surrounding areas.

Patterson's autobiography One-eyed Baz was published in 2010 by Pennant Books. The book has attracted positive reviews on Amazon.

Kickboxing
During his active years as a professional kickboxer Patterson achieved many awards for fighting all across the globe, including Japan and the USA. Patterson fought Dennis Alexio for the VACANT International Kickboxing Federation (IKF) World title in 1997, but lost by KO. Within his career of over 60 fights, notable opponents Patterson has fought against include former heavyweight WBC boxing world champion Vitali Klitschko and Dennis Alexio.

Mixed martial arts
In October 1999, Patterson made his debut in mixed martial arts (MMA) at an It's Showtime event.

In 2005, at the Cage Warriors Fighting Championship event at Coventry's SkyDome Arena Patterson fought Marc Emmanuel and was defeated in the first round. The result outraged the crowd, which was rumoured to include his fellow Zulu warrior members, and resulted in a riot that forced the police to end the event. A total of 3,000 spectators were evacuated from the SkyDome Arena.

After a total of seven fights Patterson announced that he would retire, although he would do one last MMA bout, which was to take place in Rotterdam, Holland, at the "KOE - Tough was Not Enough" event on 5 October 2008 against Dutch and former pride fighter Bob Schrijber. Patterson won the fight after a judges' decision result, winning the W.I.P.U. "King of the Ring" veterans title.

Death
Patterson died of a heart attack on 22 March 2022, at the age of 56.

Titles
MMA

2008 W.I.P.U. "King of the Ring" MMA Veterans title +103 kg

Kickboxing

1996 W.A.K.O. European Championships in Belgrade, Serbia & Montenegro  +91 kg (Full-Contact)

Mixed martial arts record

|-

|Win

|align=center|4-4

|  Bob Schrijber

|Decision (unanimous)

|
|

|align=center| 2

|align=center| 5:00

|Rotterdam, Netherlands

|Wins W.I.P.U. "King of the Ring" MMA veterans title +103 kg

|-

|Loss

|align=center|3-4

| Marc Emmanuel

|KO (punch)

|
|

|align=center|1

|align=center|4:27

|Coventry, England

|
|-

|Loss

|align=center|3-3

| Dave Dalgliesh

|KO

|It's Showtime 2004 Amsterdam

|

|align=center|2

|align=center|N/A

|Amsterdam, Netherlands

|
|-

|Loss

|align=center|3-2

| Dick Vrij

|KO (punch)

|It's Showtime 2003 Amsterdam

|

|align=center|2

|align=center|1:47

|Amsterdam, Netherlands

|
|-

|Loss

|align=center|3-1

| Joop Kasteel

|Submission (side choke)

|It's Showtime – As Usual / Battle Time

|

|align=center|1

|align=center|3:43

|Haarlem, Netherlands

|
|-

|Win

|align=center|3-0

| Hans Nijman

|KO (punches)

|It's Showtime - Original

|

|align=center|1

|align=center|1:47

|Haarlem, Netherlands

|
|-

|Win

|align=center|2-0

| Stanislav Nuschik

|Submission (smother choke)

|It's Showtime - Exclusive

|

|align=center|2

|align=center|2:30

|Haarlem, Netherlands

|
|-

|Win

|align=center|1-0

| Sander MacKilljan

|KO (punch)

|It's Showtime - It's Showtime

|

|align=center|1

|align=center|2:51

|Haarlem, Netherlands

|
|-

References

1965 births
2022 deaths
Heavyweight kickboxers
English male kickboxers
English male mixed martial artists
Black British sportspeople
Super heavyweight mixed martial artists
Mixed martial artists utilizing kickboxing
Sportspeople from Birmingham, West Midlands
Sportspeople from Handsworth, West Midlands